Fotbal Kunovice is a Czech football club located in Kunovice (Uherské Hradiště District). The club played four seasons in the Czech 2. Liga, from 2002–03 to 2005–06. It currently plays in the Zlínský kraj 1.B třída skupina C, which is in the seventh tier of Czech football.

Historical names
 1932 — SK Kunovice
 1953 — DSO Spartak Kunovice
 1958 — TJ SPP Kunovice
 1965 — TJ LET Kunovice
 1988 — TJ Kunovice
 1999 — FK Kunovice
 2009 — Fotbal Kunovice

Honours
Moravian–Silesian Football League (third tier)
 Champions 2001–02

References

External links
 Official website 

Football clubs in the Czech Republic
Association football clubs established in 1932
Uherské Hradiště District